Mark William Kent Blunderfield (born July 18, 1985) is a Canadian singer-songwriter and yoga teacher. He is signed to Nettwerk Records/Sony Music (WMG) with music released through Spirit Voyage Records. Blunderfield's music is influenced by his roots in New York City's musical theater scene and by spiritual hymns and mantras which he first became familiar with as a child in the British Columbia Boys Choir. He is an ambassador for lululemon athletica, Vega, and Manduka Yoga Mats. Xtra identified Blunderfield as an activist for diversity and social equality in schools. In 2012, Blunderfield achieved mainstream fame in Japan where he has toured extensively and where Long Time Sun, the first single off the international version of his album, became a radio hit.

Education 
At 17, Blunderfield moved from Vancouver to New York City to study theatre on scholarship at the American Musical and Dramatic Academy, where he was classmates with Jason Derulo, Janelle Monáe and Jason Mraz. His original plan was to pursue a career on Broadway, but he soon changed his mind and decided to pursue music and yoga, a discipline which he was introduced to while at the school and, according to him, has the potential to change the world.

Career 
Blunderfield performs and teaches around the world at workshops, retreats and conferences. He became a yoga enthusiast in the Bikram school, but now teaches a blend of Bikram Yoga and his own invented style. In late 2010, Nettwerk Music Group CEO and yoga enthusiast Terry McBride, who had previously managed artists such as Coldplay, Avril Lavigne, and Sarah McLachlan, signed Blunderfield to the label's yoga-inspired Nutone Records alongside Donna De Lory, Wade Morissette, and Krishna Das.

In May 2011, he recorded a duet with Juno Award-winning, multi-platinum record selling artist Bif Naked for the international version of his album Hallelujah. He has charted primarily in the world music, new age and occasionally in the mainstream charts. Blunderfield's album was released in July 2011 worldwide and debuted at number one on the iTunes world music chart.

He has also created a charity foundation, Fukushima Yoga Project, had a Canadian television spot as yoga & wellness expert (Life & Style with Zara) and produced a line of japa mala jewelry products labelled "Rock Om". He has contributed opinion pieces to many publications and performed a cabaret show Yoga Fantasia.

In 2015, Blunderfield starred in the primetime reality show Why Did You Come to Japan? (YOUは何しに日本へ？). He released a theme song in conjunction with the show titled "Story," written by Japanese popstar Ai.

He performs original compositions inspired by devotional chant, World Music, Musical Theater and Mantra Music during savasana.

In February 2018, Blunderfield released the title track of his second full-length album, a cover of Wild Horses by The Rolling Stones. The song and album were produced by Grammy and Juno Award-winning producers Brian West (Sia, Bono, Nelly Furtado), Mike Southworth (Bif Naked), and Adam Stanton (Jess Moskaluke).

Blunderfield launched a short film for his song Even When You're Gone (For Eliah), which he dedicated to a friend who died of a fentanyl overdose. The video was filmed in Vancouver and was directed by Canadian documentary filmmaker Charles Wilkinson. The film was nominated as an official selection at the Austin Spotlight Film Festival.

Philanthropy and activism

Will Blunderfield has been involved in extensive philanthropic activities. He partnered with YYoga, Tamara Rhodes and other Vancouver yogis to contribute tracks on Listen to Understand, a Kirtan-inspired collection of inspirational music, which was released in late 2010. Proceeds from album sales went to the BC Children's Hospital.

Blunderfield is also a spokesperson for a tolerance organization, The Diversity Project. Blunderfield explained to Xtra about becoming a spokesperson, saying, "I didn't really have any role models when I was in high school, and it was really difficult for me. I didn't have a practice like yoga to ground me in the knowledge that there's nothing wrong with me.... I want to use yoga to help people embrace themselves regardless of any abuse they may have experienced because of their sexual or gender identity, race or size."

Blunderfield recorded a single of the classic song Stand by Me in 2019 along with a sold-out concert series with all proceeds benefitting Out in Schools, a program created by the Vancouver Queer Film Festival to showcase LGBTQ-themed movies in Canadian high schools with the intention of lessening bullying and promoting understanding and diversity.

Blunderfield has also supported the following notable charities:

 Africa Yoga Project
 Yoga Aid
 Red Cross Japan
 Once Upon a Cure
 Canadian National Institute for the Blind CNIB

Discography
 Hallelujah (2010)
 Hallelujah (2011) (International Sony Music/WMG version)
 Amazing Grace EP [WMG] (2012)
 Story EP Universal Music Japan (2015)
 Dancing in the Rain EP (2015) (Asia)
 Wild Horses (2018)
 Will Blunderfield / Tej Randhir & Friends: Live at The Cultch (2019)
 Aquarian Sadhana (2019)
 Wild Horses (The Remixes) EP (2019)
 Hallelujah (10th Anniversary Extended Edition) (2020)
 Greatest Hits & Other Delights (2020)

References

External links 
  Official Website
 http://yyoga.ca/blog/on-the-mat-with-will-blunderfield/ at YYOGA
 http://www.lululemon.com/vancouver/robson/ambassadors/WillBlunderfield Ambassador for "Lululemon Athletica"

1985 births
Living people
Canadian world music musicians
Musicians from Vancouver
Canadian LGBT singers
Canadian LGBT songwriters
Canadian gay musicians
Gay singers
Gay songwriters
20th-century Canadian LGBT people
21st-century Canadian LGBT people